Laesio enormis (Latin: abnormal harm) is a legal doctrine that gives a contracting party the ability to rescind an agreement if the price of exchange is less than a certain sum (for instance one half, or two thirds) of its actual value. The principle was developed as a way to ensure that people received a just price (iustum pretium) in exchange, and in opposition to the Imperial Roman view, found in the Corpus Juris Civilis, that the parties to an exchange were entitled to try to outwit one another.

Modern law
The Louisiana Civil Code article 2589 permits rescission for lesion beyond moiety. It states that the seller may rescind the sale of an immovable when the price, or the property it is exchanged for, is less than one half of the fair market value. Special rules apply to exchanges that have one party exchanging immovable property for a mixture of immovable or movable property, and cash—the party exchanging the mixture of property has the right to rescind the exchange, not the party exchanging the immovable.

The Austrian Civil Code §934 also allows the contracting party to rescind for lesion beyond moiety (Verkürzung über die Hälfte) if the rescinding party receives less than half of the fair value of the consideration. The other party may avert rescission by agreeing to pay the difference to full value. This form of laesio enormis has been criticized from a legal and economics perspective for its inefficient incentives. In many cases it is impossible to profit from gathering information because profits above the mentioned threshold are prohibited by the law.

See also 
 Consideration - a related concept in common law systems
 Unconscionability
 Intrinsic fraud

Notes

References
H Grotius, De Jure Belli ac Pacis (1964) ch XI, trans FW Kelsey
M Weber, Economy and Society (1978) 578, 583, 589 and 1198
RH Tawney, Religion and the Rise of Capitalism (1922) 40–44, on Aquinas and just price
Dawson, 'Economic Duress and Fair Exchange in French and German Law' (1937) 11 Tulane Law Review 345, 365
Holstein, 'Vices of Consent in the Law of Contracts' (1939) 13 Tulane Law Review 560, 569
WJ Ashley, An Introduction to English Economic History and Theory (1920) 126, on just price
M Wolf, Rechtsgeschäftliche Entscheidungsfreiheit und vertraglicher Interessenausgleich (1971)
AT Mehren and J Gordley, The Civil Law System (1977) 926
J Gordley, 'Equality in Exchange' (1981) 69 Calif LR 1387

Civil law (legal system)
Contract law
Real property law
Louisiana law
Legal rules with Latin names